Carl Heinrich Wilhelm Hagen (Dietersheim-Dottenheim, 10 October 1810 – Bern, 24 January 1868), also Karl Hagen, was a German historian and member of the Frankfurt Parliament.

External links
 

1810 births
1868 deaths
19th-century German historians
German politicians
19th-century German male writers
German male non-fiction writers